Droyßig is a municipality in the Burgenlandkreis district, in Saxony-Anhalt, Germany. On 1 January 2010 it absorbed the former municipality Weißenborn.

Geography
Droyßig is located about 8 km west of Zeitz.

History

Droyßig was first mentioned in a document in 1170. Albrecht von Turt made an establishment of a branch (Commandery) of the Knights Templar in 1214, who bore the nickname Droyßig from 1190. In 1312, afters the Order's prohibition on the site was taken over by the Knights of St. John. The Counts of Orlamünde had their establishment in Droyßig until expire in 1413. The Lords of Bünau have 1413 to 1622 as Droyßig landgravial feud, after which by Hoym. 1622 is a rupture of the castle and a castle under renovation for the Christian Julius von Hoym. In Hoymschen owned Droyßig remained until its expiry in 1769 and then went to 1945 on the property of the Prince of Schonberg-Waldenburg.

Until 1989 there was the central institution of the Pioneer organization, Ernst Thalmann (ZIPO) in Droyßig.

Politics

The council is composed of Droyßig from 12 Ratsfrauen and councilors. Evelyn Billing has been mayor of Droyßig since 2016.

Culture and sightseeing

Structures

The Castle Droyßig was at the beginning of the 13th Century as an imperial castle built. Today's impressive living quarters the town its character.

Monuments

A memorial stone in the park (for DDR-time "Ernst-Thalmann-Park") commemorates the victims of fascism. The situated there Thalmann bust was removed after 1989.

Regular events

The Castle Festival is always the beginning of June and Others organized with a medieval market. Well known in the surrounding communities is also the annual Christmas market takes place, which takes place just one day in December, around the historic castle. Also an annual event with a large regional reputation is established in the city of Stiftungsfest Christophorus Gymnasium of CJD in May each year, recalls that at the foundation of Droyßiger institutions and attracts mainly families of pupils at school.

Economy and infrastructure

Transport

The railroad Zeitz-Camburg was set aside in 2000. Adjacent communities like Droyßig have spoken out on political grounds for a bus (in the whole region bus (in parallel) transport and railway lines to set the agenda), the (very small and often congested) bus service is made public, business and traffic point of view not much longer so portable, it is an association for the promotion of the railway line to be established.
Connects to highway 180 to Zeitz and Naumburg (Saale), it is 4 km in a northerly direction.

Personalities

Sons and daughters of the town

 Catarina Fitztuhm née Binau to Dresig (Droyßig) (c. 1496–1558), buried in St Martin's Church, Apolda
 Ludwig Gebhard von Hoym (1631–1711), Royal Saxon Elector and Polish real Privy Council, crag, chamber president and chief tax district in Thuringia, hereditary chamberlain of the Principality of Halberstadt and landlord to Droyßig, ways of life, and Burgscheidungen Kirchscheidungen
 Adolph Magnus Hoym (1668–1723), Royal Saxon Elector and Polish real Privy Council, cabinet ministers, general excise tax inspector, senior tax manager and entrepreneur
 Ernst Ortlepp (1800–1864), poet of the pre
 Johann Karl Zeune (1736–1788), German philologist

People who have worked on site

 Michael Ranft (1700–1774), theologian scholar who wrote many works, including a famous work on vampirism. Was a pastor in the city 1739/44-1749
 Friedrich Wilhelm Kritzinger, (1816–1890) theologian, teacher and songwriter, first director of Droyßiger institutions
 Hildegard Scholz (23 January 1894 in Leipzig – 6 December 6 1991 in Brunswick), a painter and a freelance artist for three decades working as an art teacher for young women and girls in institutions Droyßiger
 Petra Pau (born 1963), Vice-President of the German Parliament (The Left), 1979 training at the Central Institute of the pioneer organization in Droyßig

References

External links

 Website of Droyßig
 Book about Droyßig
 Musicorchestra of Droyßig

Burgenlandkreis
Municipalities in Saxony-Anhalt